Omphalotropis howeinsulae  is a species of minute salt marsh snail with an operculum, a terrestrial gastropod mollusk, or micromollusk, in the family Assimineidae. This species is endemic to Australia.

References

Gastropods of Australia
Omphalotropis
Assimineidae
Gastropods described in 1944
Taxonomy articles created by Polbot
Taxa named by Tom Iredale